Top Model. Zostań modelką, Cycle 3 (Polish for Top Model. Become a Model) is the third Cycle of an ongoing reality documentary based on Tyra Banks' America's Next Top Model that pits contestants from Poland against each other in a variety of competitions to determine who will win the title of the next Polish Top Model and a lucrative modeling contract with NEXT Model Management, as well as an appearance on the cover of the Polish issue of Glamour and a nationwide Always Discreet campaign in hopes of a successful future in the modeling business. The competition was hosted by Polish-born model Joanna Krupa who served as the lead judge alongside fashion designer Dawid Woliński, fashion show director Kasia Sokołowska and photographer Marcin Tyszka.

The first destination this cycle was Mumbai. The second international destination was set in Madeira. The winner of the competition was 20-year-old Zuza Kołodziejczyk from Poznań.

Auditions
The auditions took place in May, June and July 2012 in four Polish cities: Poznań, Rzeszów, Białystok and Warsaw.

Contestants
(ages stated are at start of contest)

Episodes

Episode 1
Original Air Date: March 6, 2013

First casting episode. The judges scout for model hopefuls to take part in the competition.

Episode 2
Original Air Date: March 13, 2013

Second casting episode. The search continues as the spots in the semi-finals begin to dwindle.

Episode 3
Original Air Date: March 20, 2013

Third casting episode. The wannabe models secure their place in the semi-finals, and take part in a glamorous runway show.

Episode 4
Original Air Date: March 27, 2013

The final stage of castings takes place, along with a photo shoot. The girls are divided into five groups and each team is assigned a brief to follow. It's every model for herself as the final fourteen contestants are selected to move into the model house.

Names in bold represent eliminated semi-finalists

Episode 5
Original Air Date: April 3, 2013

The girls move into the model home, and take part in a catwalk challenge. Tamara snatches her first challenge win, and chooses Marcela to share the 'top of the top' room with her.

Challenge winner: Tamara Subbotko	

Later the models receive their make-overs. For the shoot, the girls must pose in pairs under extreme weather conditions.

At panel, Ola A, Ania C, Ania P, Asia, Klaudia, Marcela, and Tamara gain immunity from elimination. Asia also receives first call-out.  Ania K, Ksenia, and Marta land in the bottom three, and all three are called forward for elimination. Ania is saved, leaving Ksenia and Marta remaining. Joanna Krupa expresses her desire to save Ksenia from elimination, but reveals that none of the judges agreed with her. Joanna hands the remaining photograph to Marta, and Ksenia is eliminated from the competition. 
 
Immune/first call-out: Asia Zaremska	
Bottom three: Ania Koryto, Ksenia Chlebicka & Marta Zimlińska 
Eliminated: Ksenia Chlebicka
Featured photographer: Robert Wolanski 
Special guests: None

Episode 6
Original Air Date: April 10, 2013

The girls are coached on their skills by model mentor Kasia Sokołowska and model Zuza Bijoch. Ola K is chosen as the winner of the lesson due to her strong runway walk.

Challenge winner: Ola Krysiak	

Back at the house, some of the girls begin to bicker with Asia. Sometime afterwards, the models are taken to their very first fashion show, and were asked to walk on a catwalk that is suspended several stories above the ground. Most of the girls struggle to remain composed, but some of them - most notably Ania C and Marcela - manage to do well. Meanwhile, Renata refuses to walk entirely due to her fear of heights. Ania C is ultimately chosen by the designer as the winner of the challenge.

Challenge winner: Ania Cybulska

For the photo shoot, the contestants must stage dive as rock stars into a crowd of waiting fans. At panel, Ola K, Marta, Zuza, Ania P, and Marcela are praised for their pictures. The rest of the girls receive mixed feedback. Ola A is reprimanded for making excuses, and Renata is criticized for having refused to walk on the runway. During elimination, Zuza receives best photo.  Ola A, Ania C, and  Renata find themselves in the bottom three. Ania C is saved, while Renata is the questioned on the spot about her passion for modelling. In the end, Ola A is eliminated from the competition for having failed to reach her full potential.

First call-out: Zuza Kołodziejczyk
Bottom three: Ania Cybulska, Ola Antas & Renata Kurczab
Eliminated: Ola Antas
Featured photographer: Emil Bilinski
Special guests: Zuza Bijoch, Ewelina Lisowska

Episode 7
Original Air Date: April 17, 2013

The remaining twelve models meet Witold Szmańda for a lesson on health training. Ania P becomes emotional after Witold measures her waist, because she is the only plus sized model in the cast. She also refuses to take part in the lesson. The best performer during the lesson is deemed to be Klaudia, and she is chosen as the challenge winner by Witold.

Challenge winner: Klaudia Strzyżewska	

Later during the episode, the girls are introduced to actress Daria Widarska for an acting lesson. Tempers flare between Ania P and Ola after one of the exercises in the lesson, in which the girls are told to scream at each other. Ania once again refuses to participate.

For the first photo shoot, the models split themselves into three groups of four, and they shoot three different covers for Glamour Magazine with their judges, of which only the cover from the winning group will actually be published.

The following night, the girls take part in their second photo shoot, where they have to portray sexy and romantic vampires from various films and shows.

At panel, it is revealed that all three of the Glamour covers will be published. Ania K, Marcela, and Marta are praised the most for having portrayed their theme the best. They also receive immunity from elimination for the week. Ania C's photograph leaves much to be desired, and she lands in the bottom three for a consecutive time. Ultimately, it is Ania P and Justyna who are placed in the bottom two. Ania P is eliminated from the competition due to her inability to handle critique.

Immune/first call-out: Ania Koryto
Bottom three: Ania Cybulska, Ania Piechowiak & Justyna Pawlicka
Eliminated: Ania Piechowiak
Featured photographer: Marcin Kempski (vampire shoot)
Special guests: Witold Szmańda, Daria Widawska

Episode 8
Original Air Date: April 24, 2013

The models prepare to take part in their very first runway casting for the S/S Bohoboco collection. Mentor Kasia Sokołowska reveals that she will be the casting director, and will bar girls from walking in the show if she deems them unprepared for walking on the runway. After the casting takes place, the girls wait at home to hear the results. Justyna, Marta, and Ania K are chosen to sit out from the show. The following day, fittings take place. After a change of plans, Zuza and Asia are also dropped from the show at the last minute. The remaining girls participate in the show, and at the end of the day, Kasia and Joanna Krupa agree that Tamara and Renata performed the best overall.

For the challenge, the girls shoot a poolside commercial for Gillette Venus & Olay razors. Actress Julia Pietrucha drops by to help the girls while they shoot their commercial. Zuza is chosen as the winner of the challenge for her believable performance and sincere personality.

Challenge winner: Zuza Kołodziejczyk	

The following day, the contestants are photographed by Adam Plucinski. They are given fifteen minutes to perform three shoots. In the first shoot, they are photographed on the red carpet. In the second, they must pose with male models. For the third, they must become romantic actresses. At panel, Renata wins the judges over and receives first call-out. She is also chosen as the winner of the runway challenge that had taken place earlier during the episode.

Challenge winner: Renata Kurczab	

Ania K, Asia, and Marta are called forward as the bottom-three contestants. Asia is the first girl saved from elimination. Despite having received best picture the episode before, Ania K is eliminated from the competition due to her rapidly declining performance throughout the week.

First call-out: Renata Kurczab	
Bottom three: Ania Koryto, Asia Zaremska & Marta Zimlińska		 
Eliminated: Ania Koryto
Featured photographer: Adam Plucinski
Featured director: Tadeusz Sliwa
Special guests: Kamil Owczarek, Michal Gilbert Lach, Julia Pietrucha

Episode 9
Original Air Date: May 1, 2013

Witold Szmanda drops by the model house to teach the girls a lesson on healthy eating. Ola, Marcela, and Asia express their distaste with some of the vegetable juices being made. Later that day the models head over to Lodz, an exceptional second-hand shop, where they meet Michal Pirog and stylist Malwina Wędzikowska. They are asked to create outfits under five themes: Minimal, Etno, Rock, Retro, and Military with accessories and clothes from the shop.

Marcela is chosen as the winner of the challenge. As her prize, she receives a dress from Michał's latest collection.

Challenge winner: Marcela Leszczak	

The following morning, the models are introduced to Austrian model, writer, and human rights activist Waris Dirie. For the second challenge the contestants are divided into groups of three to create several photographs embodying various global issues. Most girls enjoy coming up with ideas for the challenge, but Marcela, Asia, and Ola are reprimanded for their indecisiveness and lack of cohesion as a team. Ultimately Justyna, Marta, and Tamara are chosen as the challenge winners.

Challenge winners: Justyna Pawlicka, Marta Zimlińska & Tamara Subbotko	

For the shoot, the girls are photographed semi-nude in editorials by Marcin Tyszka. They each take a close-up picture and a full body shot. Zuza has to take two portrait shots because Marcin doesn't like the way her body looks in the pictures. Justyna, Tamara, Renata, Marcela, and Klaudia excel during their sessions. Ola becomes frustrated and begins to cry and complain when it's her turn to shoot, annoying Marcin.

At panel, Waris Dirie is guest judge. Renata and Tamara receive universal praise from the judges for their photographs, while Klaudia receives the most praise from Dirie being named her favorite from day one. Renata receives best picture during elimination. Ola comes under fire for her bad attitude on set during the shoot, while Marta is once again criticized for her lack of confidence. As a result, they both land in the bottom three with Zuza, who had under performed during the shoot. The judges decide to save Ola and Zuza in that order. Marta is eliminated after making her consecutive appearance in the bottom two, having made three in total during her stay in the competition.

First call-out: Renata Kurczab	
Bottom three: Marta Zimlińska, Ola Krysiak & Zuza Kołodziejczyk	 
Eliminated: Marta Zimlińska
Featured photographer: Marcin Tyszka
Special guests: Witold Szmańda, Malwina Wędzikowska, Waris Dirie

Episode 10
Original Air Date: May 8, 2013

The episode begins when the girls are driven to meet Joanna Krupa and photographer Wojtek Wojtczak for an advertising campaign on a conveyor belt catwalk. The goal is to evoke confidence while at the same time producing and image that is both appealing and fresh. Most of the models struggle to maintain their balance, but it is Justyna who manages to make the most lasting impression. She is chosen as the winner of the challenge. As her prize, she receives a dress from Discreet, courtesy of Asia Winiarska and Martyna Kostrzynska. She is also given the chance to have her picture featured in Glamour Magazine.

Challenge winner: Justyna Pawlicka

The following day, the models attend a D'Vision casting where they meet Anja Rubik and Lucyna Szymanska. It is revealed to the girls by Anja that after the casting, only eight of them will remain in the competition. One by one, each girl brings her portfolio to Anja and Lucyna. Marcela is criticized for being unprepared. Anja also learns about Ola's recurring attitude problem, while Klaudia comes across as having little ambition. Asia impresses with her fashion knowledge but only by having remembered two photographers, David Sims and Annie Leibovitz, from a magazine she read five minutes prior to the casting. Immediately after the casting, all the girls are called back into the room. Ania, Asia, Justyna, Renata, Tamara, and Zuza are quickly dismissed. Anja singles out Klaudia, Marcela, and Ola as having been the worst. Klaudia and Marcela rejoin the other girls outside, and it is revealed that Ola has been eliminated.

Bottom three: Klaudia Strzyżewska, Marcela Leszczak & Ola Krysiak	
Eliminated outside of judging panel: Ola Krysiak	

For the shoot, the contestants are photographed as couture ballerinas by Ram Shergill. Anja drops by to watch the girls during their shoot, and most of them manage to do a fairly good job. Renata becomes distressed over not wanting to fall in her heels, and Asia has to change into another outfit in the middle of her session.

Ram sits as guest judge at panel. Klaudia receives undivided praise for her photo, while Justyna is congratulated on her continued improvement as the competition progresses. Despite having performed decently during her photo shoot, Marcela fails to impress the judges with her final result. Renata is heavily critiqued by the judges for not being able to conquer her fears. Asia's photo is seen as stiff and static. During elimination, Klaudia receives her first best photo. Asia, Marcela, and Renata are revealed to be in the bottom-three. Marcela and Renata are both given a second chance, while Asia is eliminated

First call-out: Klaudia Strzyżewska
Bottom three: Asia Zaremska, Marcela Leszczak & Renata Kurczab 	 
Eliminated: Asia Zaremska
Featured photographer: Ram Shergill
Special guests: Wojtek Wojtczak, Martyna Kostrzynska, Asia Winiarska, Anja Rubik, Lucyna Szymanska

Episode 11
Original Air Date: May 15, 2013

The episode begins when the girls are taken to a railway station. The goal is to attract the attention of passersby, who will vote for the models they think are performing the best. The model with the most votes wins the challenge. After the votes are counted, Justyna is revealed to be the challenge winner. As her prize, she is given the opportunity to have some photos taken in D'vision for her portfolio. Since Klaudia is second in the lead by a small number of votes, she also gets to take part in the challenge winnings.

Challenge winners: Justyna Pawlicka & Klaudia Strzyżewska

Later the models get taken to a dancing lesson challenge. Once again, Justyna snatches another challenge win. As her prize for winning the dancing challenge, she is given the chance to take dancing classes with winner of the fourth season of the polish show You can dance. The classes continue with lessons of modern dance with Michał Piróg. Zuza reveals that she is afraid of looking at her body and reflection in mirrors. As a result, she chooses to leave the lesson.

Challenge winner: Justyna Pawlicka

The next day the girls receive a surprise visit from their mothers, with whom they will have to perform in a photo shoot. Renata has to work with her sister because her mother died when she was little.

At panel, Tamara receives best picture. Ania, Klaudia, and Zuza are called forward for elimination. Joanna proceeds to eliminate Ania for having plateaued throughout most of her stay in the competition. Once Ania exits the stage, Joanna simultaneously hands Klaudia and Zuza their pictures, and reveals that neither of them will be eliminated. The remaining six girls rejoice, and it is announced that the rest of the competition will take place in India.

First call-out: Tamara Subbotko
Bottom three: Ania Cybulska, Klaudia Strzyżewska & Zuza Kołodziejczyk 	 
Eliminated: Ania Cybulska
Featured photographer: Marlena Bielińska
Special guests: Asia Zwierzyńska, Michał Maciejewski, Kacper Matuszewski Smu, Mothers of contestants

Episode 12
Original Air Date: May 22, 2013

The final six models arrive in Mumbai, India for the remainder of the competition. The girls are taught how to properly put on a sari, and Renata expresses that all the girls are jealous of her. She refuses to help Marcela into her sari. For wearing the outfit best, Tamara wins her very own sari.

Challenge winner: Tamara Subbotko

For the next challenge, the contestants must attend their first go-sees. There are four different clients; the girl who books the most clients will be chosen as the winner of the challenge. The girls are broken up into teams of two and are sent off to their go-sees.

The cars the girls are driving in to get to their go-sees repeatedly break down. The wheels on Klaudia and Zuza's car loses a wheel along the way, but they manage to meet with all four clients nevertheless.  Other mishaps happen along the way, including engines that won't restart, and cars that have to be pushed to their destination. Justyna and Zuza fail to book any jobs, while Klaudia, Renata, and Tamara manage to book one. Marcela books two jobs, automatically winning the challenge.

Challenge winner: Marcela Leszczak

For the photo shoot, the models are taken to an Indian temple. The contestant with the best photograph will be featured on the Vogue India website.

At panel, Marcela's photograph is met with undivided adoration from the judges, and she receives first call-out. Klaudia and Justyna land in the bottom two. Joanna hands Klaudia the last photograph, and Justyna is eliminated.

First call-out: Marcela Leszczak 
Bottom two: Justyna Pawlicka & Klaudia Strzyżewska
Eliminated: Justyna Pawlicka
Special Reward Winners: Marcela Leszczak & Renata Kurczab
Featured photographer: Suresh Natarajan
Special guests: Asmita Marwa, Narendra Kumar, Masaba, Shivan & Narresh

Episode 13
Original Air Date: May 29, 2013

The models attend a yoga lesson in preparation for Lakme Fashion Week. All the girls are fitted for dresses, and rehearse for the runway. Not every contestant is allowed to walk, and Klaudia is ultimately dropped from the show. The four other girls take part in the runway show, while Klaudia is forced to sit out backstage until the event ends without her.

 Challenge winner: Marcela Leszczak

The following day, the girls go out for a stroll in Mumbai with Michał Piróg. The models experience Bollywood dancing Slumdog Millionaire style, and have their pictures taken with the locals around them.

For the photo shoot, the models must pose with nature and different architectural landscapes as their backdrop. The task is to create a photograph worthy of being featured on the pages of Harper's Bazaar. Zuza excels during her shoot, and the photographer expresses his admiration for her. Tamara struggles to take a good picture. Klaudia is praised during the shoot by the photographer and several onlookers. When it is Renata's turn to shoot, Marcin and Dawid begin to complain about the photographer behind his back. Marcela is photographed last, with little hassle, as usual.

At the final panel of the series, Renata is complimented on having delivered a strong editorial photograph. The judges also like Zuza and Marcela's picture. Tamara is criticized on her personal style and her uninspiring photo. Although Klaudia was praised during the shoot, she too receives heavy critique for her final results. The judges deliberate  on who should move on to the live final, and the girls are called back for elimination. Renata receives best photo. Marcela and Zuza follow her in that order. The judges eventually pick Klaudia for her superior portfolio as the last girl in the final four who will move on to the finale, leaving Tamara to be eliminated.

First call-out: Renata Kurczab	
Bottom three: Klaudia Strzyżewska, Tamara Subbotko & Zuza Kołodziejczyk		
Eliminated: Tamara Subbotko
Featured photographer: Vishal Kullarwal
Special guests: None

Episode 14
Original Air Date: June 5, 2013

The finale begins with the show highlighting how the contestants made their way to the top four. From that point on, all eliminations will be based on the public SMS voting. Footage from the models' final photo shoot for their Glamour magazine covers and spreads in Madeira is shown. The judges comment briefly on the final four covers that the girls took. Zuza is the first contestant declared safe, and Joanna Krupa hands her a copy of her cover from the shoot. Marcela follows in the same manner. Klaudia and Renata wait for their verdict, and as an immediate result of having obtained the least support from the public, Renata is eliminated from the competition.

Final four: Klaudia Strzyżewska, Marcela Leszczak, Renata Kurczab & Zuza Kołodziejczyk
Eliminated: Renata Kurczab

The next segment of the live final is an outlandish lingerie fashion show in which the three remaining models and the previously eliminated contestants walk. Shortly after the runway show ends, a commercial for Samsung Galaxy cameras that the girls had shot is screened for the audience. The final elimination of the series before the top two takes place moments after the commercial is shown. For accumulating the highest percentage of votes, Zuza and Marcela move on to the final stage of the competition in that order. Having made her fifth consecutive appearance in the bottom two, Klaudia is eliminated.

Final three: Klaudia Strzyżewska, Marcela Leszczak & Zuza Kołodziejczyk
Eliminated: Klaudia Strzyżewska	

For the final challenge of the season, Marcela and Zuza have to perform in a live shoot as the public watches them at home and from the audience. Inspired by the film American Beauty, the models must lay in lingerie on a bed of blue flower petals while a photographer suspended from the ceiling takes their photographs for the Polish public to see. Each girl is given one minute to get her pictures taken.

A second runway show accompanied with a musical performance from Patricia Kazadi takes place following the live shoot. The voting session comes to an end, and before revealing the winner of the competition, the judges and other experts are asked to comment on their opinions of the final two contestants. Kasia Sokolowska and Dawid Woliński like both Marcela and Zuza. Anja Rubik prefers Zuza over Marcela due to her warm and endearing personality. Marcin Tyszka states that he has fallen in love with Marcela.

Immediately after, the girls stand with Joanna in front of a large screen on stage. Zuza's Glamour cover flashes onto the screen, and she is revealed to be the third winner of the competition.

Final two: Marcela Leszczak & Zuza Kołodziejczyk	
Poland's Next Top Model: Zuza Kołodziejczyk	  
Featured photographer: Mateusz Stankiewicz (Glamour shoot)
Special guests: Anja Rubik, Patricia Kazadi, Saif Mahdi (President of NEXT Paris)

Summaries

Call-out order

 The contestant was immune from elimination
 The contestant was eliminated
 The contestant was eliminated outside of judging panel
 The contestant won the competition

Episodes 1, 2, 3 and 4 were casting episodes. In episode 4, the pool of semi-finalists was reduced to the final 14 models who moved on to the main competition.
 In episode 5, the best-performing contestant from each photo shoot pair won immunity from elimination at panel. Asia received first call-out. The other immune girls' call-outs were not shown. 
 In episode 7, Ania K., Marcela and Marta gained immunity from elimination at panel. Ania K. received first call-out.
 In episode 10, Anja Rubik deemed Ola K., Klaudia, and Marcela to be the least impressive models during the casting. Anja chose to eliminate Ola K.
 In episode 11, Joanna called Ania C., Klaudia, and Zuza forward as the bottom three. She first announced that Ania C. was eliminated, then handed Klaudia and Zuza their photos.

Bottom Two/Three/Four 

 The contestant was eliminated after their first time in the bottom two
 The contestant was eliminated after their second time in the bottom two
 The contestant was eliminated after their third time in the bottom two
 The contestant was eliminated outside of judging panel
 The contestant was eliminated in the judging and placed fourth
 The contestant was eliminated in the final judging and placed third.
 The contestant was eliminated in the final judging and placed second.

Photo shoot guide
Episode 4 photo shoot:  Group shots in Czocha Castle (semifinals)
Episode 5 photo shoot: Headdresses and bikinis in pairs 
Episode 6 photo shoot: stage diving rock stars
Episode 7 photo shoots: Glamour Pad covers in groups; sexy & romantic vampires  
Episode 8 photo shoot: Red carpet fashion starlets
Episode 9 photo shoot: Editorial by Marcin Tyszka
Episode 10 photo shoot: Haute couture ballerinas
Episode 11 photo shoot: Relationships with mothers
Episode 12 photo shoot: Indian temple for Vogue India
Episode 13 photo shoot: Editorial in Mumbai for Harper's Bazaar India
Episode 14 photo shoots: Glamour Pad magazine covers & spreads in Madeira; Samsung Galaxy commercials; posing on a pile of blue petals

References 

 

1
2013 Polish television seasons